Gov. Samuel Ashe Grave is a historic grave site located near Rocky Point, North Carolina. The grave is located in the Ashe family cemetery.  It is the grave of Governor Samuel Ashe (1725–1813) and is marked by an eight-foot by four-foot granite slab installed in 1967.

It was listed on the National Register of Historic Places in 2001.

References

External links
 

Buildings and structures in Pender County, North Carolina
National Register of Historic Places in Pender County, North Carolina